Birkir Bjarnason (born 27 May 1988) is an Icelandic professional footballer who plays as a central midfielder for Süper Lig club Adana Demirspor and the Iceland national football team, where he is their all-time leader in appearances.

Club career

Viking FK
Birkir started playing football with local clubs in his hometown of Akureyri. His family moved to Norway in 1999 and he joined the youth teams of Figgjo. In the summer of 2005 Birkir joined Viking. In the 2006 season he scored his first goal for Viking against Hamarkameratene. Following that he played consistently as a starter for Viking and was a key aspect in helping the club avoid relegation that year and helping them obtain a third-place finish in 2007 under trainer Uwe Rösler.

In 2008 Birkir had a successful loan spell at newly promoted Tippeligaen side Bodø/Glimt, playing a big part in them finishing fourth in the league. His performances brought the attention of bigger clubs such as Serie A club Reggina during January 2008, but he stayed at Viking until 2012. During this time he made 100 appearances for Viking in the Tippeligaen, scoring 16 league goals.

Standard Liège
On 12 January 2012, it was announced that Birkir would sign for Belgian Pro League side Standard Liège on a five-year deal. He played 16 league matches in the Belgium Pro League for Standard.

Pescara
After the end of the 2011–12 season, in July 2012, Birkir joined the newly promoted Serie A side Pescara on a season-long loan deal, for €300,000, with an option to sign for an additional €900,000. He scored his first goal for Pescara in a 5–1 away defeat at Napoli. After the 2012–13 season he stated that he was not interested in going down to Serie B with Pescara and, with two years remaining of his Standard Liège contract, he was unsure where he would be playing in the 2013–14 season.

Pescara bought Birkir from Standard Liège on 9 June 2013 on a permanent transfer for a previously agreed fee, with the aim of selling him for a higher amount that summer with interest being reported from clubs in the top leagues in England including, Italy and Germany.

Sampdoria
On 2 September 2013, it was confirmed that Serie A side Sampdoria had signed Birkir on a co-ownership deal. In total he made 14 Serie A appearances during the 2013–14 season for Sampdoria.

Return to Pescara
On 20 June 2014, it was announced that Birkir would sign again for Pescara on 1 July 2014, after the club won the co-ownership bidding for the player from Sampdoria. Upon signing, he was appointed the captain for the 2014–15 season.

He scored 12 goals in 38 Serie B matches to help guide Pescara to a seventh-place finish and qualifying for the Serie B playoffs. Pescara beat Perugia 2–1 to qualify for the playoff semi-final. They beat Vicenza Calcio 3–2 over two legs in the semi-finals, with Birkir scoring the crucial match winning aggregate goal for Pescara on 2 June 2015 to help them qualify for the Serie B playoff final against Bologna. However, with a 1–1 aggregate score after two legs Bologna, being the highest-placed team, were promoted.

On 27 June 2015, Pescara announced they had accepted an offer of €1 million for Birkir from Serie A side Torino. It was later revealed in July, that the move had seemingly stalled as Birkir had been unable to agree personal terms with the club. A move to English side Leeds United also fell through.

Basel
On 7 July 2015, it was announced that Bjarnason had signed a contract with Swiss Super League club FC Basel for €1 million. On 9 July Basel confirmed the transfer, stating that he had signed a three-year contract with them. He joined Basel's first team for their 2015–16 season under head coach Urs Fischer. After playing in one test game Bjarnason played his domestic league debut for his new club in the away game in the Letzigrund on 25 July as Basel won 3–2 against Grasshopper Club. In the Champions League third qualifying round on 5 August he scored his first goal for his new club during the 1–0 home win against Lech Poznań. It was the only goal of the game, in the first minute of overtime, and Basel qualified for the play-off round. He scored his first league goal for Basel on 26 September during the 3–1 home win against Lugano. Under manager Urs Fischer Bjarnason won the Swiss Super League championship at the end of the 2015–16 Super League season. For the club it was the seventh title in a row and their 19th championship title in total.

Bjarnason was also a regular starter for the team in Basel's 2016–17 season, frequently showing good performances in all competitions. EFL Championship team Aston Villa, following their relegation in the preceding Premier League season, showed interest and on 25 January 2017 Basel announced that the club had signed the player. During his time with the club, Bjarnason played a total of 72 games for Basel scoring a total of 17 goals. 42 of these games were in the Swiss Super League, three in the Swiss Cup, 19 in the UEFA competitions (Champions League and Europa League) and eight were friendly games. He scored 14 goals in the domestic league and the other three were scored during European games.

Aston Villa
On 25 January 2017, Birkir signed a three-and-a-half-year contract with English Championship side Aston Villa. He scored his first goal for Aston Villa in an EFL Cup tie against Wigan Athletic on 22 August 2017.

Brescia
On 18 January 2020, Birkir returned to Italy, after signing a 1.5-year contract with Serie A side Brescia, after a short spell in Qatar playing for Al-Arabi.

Adana Demirspor
On 13 August 2021 he joined Turkish Süper Lig club, newly promoted, Adana Demirspor. He scored his first goal in the Süper Lig against Çaykur Rizespor on 18 September 2021.

International career

Birkir made his debut for the senior Iceland national team in 2010. He holds the all-time appearance record for the senior side, which stands at 105 caps. He has also represented them at Iceland U-21, Under 19 and Under 17 levels.

He scored his first goal for Iceland against France on 27 May 2012 in a 3–2 defeat. He also followed this up with goals for Iceland in 2014 FIFA World Cup qualification with goals against Albania on 12 October 2012, Slovenia on 7 June 2013 and then against Albania again on 10 September 2013 in a 2–1 victory. Birkir's goals and performances played a crucial role in the qualifiers helping guide Iceland to the World Cup playoffs, however in November 2013 they lost 2–0 on aggregate over two legs to Croatia.

He was called up to the national team again for UEFA Euro 2016 and achieved the honor of getting his country's first ever goal in a major tournament when he scored the equalizer against Portugal in their first group match.

On 27 June 2016, Birkir played against England in the UEFA Euro 2016 round of 16 at the Stade de Nice, as Iceland upset England with a 2–1 victory to advance to the quarter-finals.

In May 2018 he was named in Iceland's 23-man squad for the 2018 World Cup in Russia.

Career statistics

Club

International

Scores and results list Iceland's goal tally first, score column indicates score after each Birkir goal.

Honours
FC Basel
Swiss Super League: 2015–16

Aston Villa
EFL Championship play-offs: 2019

References

External links

KSI profile
Profile on the Swiss Football League homepage
Profile at Viking

1988 births
Living people
People from Akureyri
Birkir Bjarnason
Association football midfielders
Birkir Bjarnason
Birkir Bjarnason
Birkir Bjarnason
FIFA Century Club
UEFA Euro 2016 players
2018 FIFA World Cup players
Viking FK players
FK Bodø/Glimt players
Standard Liège players
Delfino Pescara 1936 players
U.C. Sampdoria players
FC Basel players
Aston Villa F.C. players
Al-Arabi SC (Qatar) players
Brescia Calcio players
Adana Demirspor footballers
Eliteserien players
Belgian Pro League players
Serie A players
Serie B players
Swiss Super League players
English Football League players
Qatar Stars League players
Süper Lig players
Birkir Bjarnason
Icelandic expatriate sportspeople in Norway
Expatriate footballers in Norway
Icelandic expatriate sportspeople in Belgium
Expatriate footballers in Belgium
Icelandic expatriate sportspeople in Italy
Expatriate footballers in Italy
Icelandic expatriate sportspeople in Switzerland
Expatriate footballers in Switzerland
Icelandic expatriate sportspeople in England
Expatriate footballers in England
Icelandic expatriate sportspeople in Qatar
Expatriate footballers in Qatar
Icelandic expatriate sportspeople in Turkey
Expatriate footballers in Turkey